The 2011–12 season was Swindon Town's first season in the League Two since 2006–07. Under the management of former AC Milan, Lazio, Celtic, Sheffield Wednesday and West Ham United footballer Paolo Di Canio, Swindon were successful in winning their first trophy since 1996 after securing the League Two championship. Town were also runners-up in the Football League Trophy, losing to Chesterfield at Wembley Stadium. The club also competed in the FA Cup, beating Premier League outfit Wigan Athletic and the League Cup.

League data

Kits and sponsors 

|
|
|
|

Overview and results

Pre-season 

The club's early pre-season was dominated by reports of who would replace Paul Hart as the new manager of Swindon Town. Hart had left the club before the end of the 2010–11 season after the club's relegation had been confirmed. Hart was replaced by youth team manager Paul Bodin had managed the club on a caretaker basis. Previously, chairman Andrew Fitton also resigned in April and was replaced by fellow board member Jeremy Wray who was immediately placed with the responsibility of appointing a new manager.

Names mentioned for the Town job included Bodin, George Burley, Paul Trollope, Dietmar Hamann, John Hughes, Gus McPherson and Paolo Di Canio. In early May the tabloid newspapers were linking Di Canio with an unlikely move to the club. Di Canio had enjoyed a popular but sometimes controversial career in England with Sheffield Wednesday and with West Ham United where he became a cult figure. On 20 May, the appointment was confirmed  with fellow Italians Fabrizio Piccareta (assistant), Claudio Donatelli (fitness) and Domenico Doardo (goalkeeping) joining the club as Di Canio's coaching staff, caretaker manager Paul Bodin reverted to his position as youth team manager.

Before the arrival of Di Canio, interim chairman Jeremy Wray announced that he would be arranging one-to-one meetings with the entire playing squad to discuss their futures. The outcome was a mass clear-out but it began with players initially declaring an interest in remaining at the club. David Prutton talked of "putting things right" before leaving to join Sheffield Wednesday shortly afterwards. Meanwhile, Scott Cuthbert told the press that he would be "delighted" to remain at Swindon but the club decided against triggering a clause on his contract to extend his deal but were rumoured to be open in renegotiating a new deal but Cuthbert later joined Leyton Orient. Former Swindon Town Player of the Year Jonathan Douglas looked set to sign a new contract but eventually turned it down for a move to Brentford.

Swindon Town returned to pre-season on 29 June 2011. During the summer, Swindon spent 10 days in Italy at a training camp in Norcia, Umbria. During the course of the week Town played two friendlies against local select sides Norcia XI and Marche XI. Upon returning to England, Swindon visited local Non-League clubs Swindon Supermarine and Cirencester Town. Both fixtures concluded in 4–0 victories for Swindon Town. The club concluded their Pre-Season with a 1–2 loss to Football League Championship outfit Reading.

League Two

The fixtures for the 2011–12 season were announced on 17 June at 09:00 BST, and revealed that Swindon will begin their League Two campaign with a home fixture against Crewe Alexandra.

August

September

October

November

December

January

February

March

April

May

League Cup

Swindon's Carling Cup Round 1 tie against Bristol City drawn to be played on 9 August 2011 was postponed on police advice. This was due to fears of safety issues following the riots throughout England, including Bristol.

Football League Trophy

F.A. Cup

As a member of League Two, Swindon Town will enter the FA Cup at the First Round stage.

Squad information

Club officials

Management record

As of 6 May 2012. Only competitive matches are counted

Captains
Accounts for all competitions. Last updated on 6 May 2012.

Squad statistics

Appearances and goals

|-
|colspan="14"|LOAN PLAYERS WHO HAVE SINCE LEFT SWINDON (Statistics shown are the appearances made and goals scored while at Swindon Town)

|-
|colspan="14"|Players who left the club on a permanent basis during the season:

|}

Goalscorers

Penalties awarded
Includes all competitive matches.

{| class="wikitable" style="font-size: 95%; text-align: center;"
|-
!width=15| 
!width=15| 
!width=15|
!width=15|
!width=150|Name
!width=150|Competition
!width=200|Opposition
!width=50|Success
!width=150|Technique
!width=150|Notes
|-
|1
|3
|DF
|
|Callum Kennedy
|League Two
|vs. Crewe Alexandra (6 August 2011)
|
|Bottom left corner
|
|-
|2
|39
|FW
|
|Mehdi Kerrouche
|League Two
|vs. Port Vale (5 November 2011)
|
|Top left corner
|
|-
|3
|17
|FW
|
|Alan Connell
|Football League Trophy
|vs. AFC Wimbledon (8 November 2011)
|
|Top left corner
|Penalty Shoot-Out
|-
|4
|13
|MF
|
|Oliver Risser
|Football League Trophy
|vs. AFC Wimbledon (8 November 2011)
|
|Top left corner
|Penalty Shoot-Out
|-
|5
|11
|MF
|
|Etiënne Esajas
|Football League Trophy
|vs. AFC Wimbledon (8 November 2011)
|
|Middle right
|Penalty Shoot-Out
|-
|6
|10
|MF
|
|Matt Ritchie
|League Two
|vs. Macclesfield Town (21 January 2012)
|
|Missed target
|
|-
|7
|2
|DF
|
|Paul Caddis
|League Two
|vs. Hereford United (18 February 2012)
|
|
|
|-
|8
|2
|DF
|
|Paul Caddis
|League Two
|vs. Aldershot Town (17 April 2012)
|
|
|
|-

Clean sheets
Includes all competitive matches.

{| class="wikitable" style="font-size: 95%; text-align: center;"
|-
!width=15| 
!width=15| 
!width=15|
!width=15|
!width=150|Name
!width=80|League Two
!width=80|FA Cup
!width=80|League Cup
!width=80|JP Trophy
!width=80|Total
|-
|1
|1
|GK
|
|Mattia Lanzano
|2
|0
|0
|0
|2
|-
|2
|26
|GK
|
|Phil Smith
|2
|0
|1
|0
|3
|-
|3
|35
|GK
|
|Wes Foderingham
|22
|1
|0
|1
|24
|-
|colspan="4"|
|TOTALS
|26
|1
|1
|1
|29

Disciplinary record

Suspensions served

Transfers

Trial players

Di Canio brought in several players on a trial basis during the early weeks as manager of Swindon. There was minor controversy when trialist Leon Knight was released from training after only two days for fitness related reasons. Knight would later direct angry messages on the social networking website Twitter towards his agent and the club for his early exit.

Monthly and weekly awards

Summary

Reserves
In June 2011 it was announced that Swindon Town would not compete in a Reserve League for the 2011–12 season and would therefore arrange friendlies with other clubs.

Wiltshire Premier Shield 
The draw for the Wiltshire Premier Shield semi-finals was made on 28 October 2011. Swindon Town was drawn to play Salisbury City with the victors scheduled to play either Chippenham Town or Swindon Supermarine in the Final.

However, it was confirmed on 13 January 2012 by Salisbury City that Swindon had withdrawn from the competition giving the South Wiltshire club a bye into the final.

References 

2011-12
2011–12 Football League Two by team